Orthoprosopa pacifica is a species of hoverfly in the family Syrphidae.

Distribution
New Caledonia.

References

Eristalinae
Insects described in 1980
Diptera of Australasia